Zhukovo is a rural locality (a selo) and the administrative center of Zhukovskoye Rural Settlement, Alexeyevsky District, Belgorod Oblast, Russia. The population was 327 as of 2010. There are 3 streets.

Geography 
Zhukovo is located 34 km south of Alexeyevka (the district's administrative centre) by road. Bublikovo is the nearest rural locality.

References 

Rural localities in Alexeyevsky District, Belgorod Oblast
Biryuchensky Uyezd